Glen Davis may refer to:

People
Glen Davis (athlete), took part in Athletics at the 1932 Summer Olympics – Men's 3000 metres steeplechase
Glen Davis (basketball) (born 1986), American former basketball player
Glen Davis (volleyball) for E.I.S. Men's Volleyball
Glen M. Davis, Australian physiotherapist and professor at the University of Sydney

Characters
Glen Davis, a character from the Zoey 101 episode "School Dance"

Places
Glen Davis, New South Wales, a town in Australia, and location of the Glen Davis Shale Oil Works.
Glen Davis Formation from Trucheosaurus

See also
Glenn Davis (disambiguation)
Glen Davies (disambiguation)

Davis, Glen

ja:グレン・デイヴィス